Scott Christian University (SCU) is a private Christian university in Machakos, Kenya.

History 
It was established by the Africa Inland Mission in 1962 as Scott Theological College (STC), and named after AIM's founder, Peter Cameron Scott.

Scott received its university charter in 1997, adopting its present name in 2012.

Academics 
Scott christian university Academic Division is composed of three schools:

 School of Theology (SOT)
 School of Education (SOE)
 School of Professional Studies (SPS)

Scott publishes an academic journal, the Africa Journal of Evangelical Theology. (AJET)

See also 

Africa Journal of Evangelical Theology (AJET)

References

Private universities and colleges in Kenya
Seminaries and theological colleges in Kenya
Educational institutions established in 1962
1962 establishments in Kenya
Machakos County